Small Wonder Records was a British independent record label owned and managed by Pete and Mari Stennett, that specialised in releasing records by punk rock and post-punk bands. It operated out of a record shop of the same name at 162 Hoe Street, Walthamstow, London. Artists to have released on the label include Bauhaus, Crass, The Cure, The Cravats, Patrik Fitzgerald, Puncture, Cockney Rejects, The Carpettes, Poison Girls and Angelic Upstarts.

The shop and labels logo, as featured on its famous paper bags, was of a well-dressed Edwardian family; the mother was white while the father and vicar were black. The baby in the picture was mixed race and according to Pete Stennett provided him with the inspiration for the name 'Small Wonder'.

Discography

Albums
 Cravat-1 The Cravats - Cravats In Toytown

Singles
 Small One Puncture - "Mucky Pup" / "You Can't Rock n Roll In A Council Flat"  7"
 Small Two Zeros - "Hungry" / "Radio Fun"  7"
 Small Three The Carpettes - "How About Me And You"  7" (4 track EP)
 Small Four Patrik Fitzgerald - "Safety-Pin Stuck In My Heart"  7" (6 track EP)
 Small Five Menace - "GLC" / "I'm Civilised"  7"
 Small Six Patrick Fitzgerald - "Backstreet Boys"  7" (4 track EP)
 Small Seven Leyton Buzzards - "19 & Mad" / "Villain" / "Youthanasia"  7"
 Small Eight Punishment of Luxury - "Puppet Life" / "The Demon"  7"
 Small Nine Carpettes - "Small Wonder" / "2 NE 1"  7"
 Small Ten Demon Preacher - "Little Miss Perfect" / "Perfect Dub"  7"
 Small Eleven The Cure - "Killing An Arab" / "10.15 Saturday Night"  7" (Later re-released on Fiction Records)
 Small Twelve Nicky & The Dots - "Never Been So Stuck" / "Linoleum Walk"  7"
 Small Thirteen Wall - "New Way" / "Suckers" / "Uniforms"  7"
 Small Fourteen Molesters - "Disco Love" / "Commuter Man"  7"
 Small Fifteen The Cravats - "The End"  7" (3 track EP)
 Small Sixteen Menace - 2Last Year's Youth" / "Carry No Banners"  7"
 Small Seventeen Murder The Disturbed - "Genetic Disruption"  7" (3 track EP)
 Small Eighteen Molesters - "End Of Civilisation" / "Girl Behind The Curtain"  7"
 Small Nineteen Cockney Rejects - "Flares 'n' Slippers" / "Police Car" / "I Wanna Be A Star"  7"
 Small Twenty Fatal Microbes - "Violence Grows" / "Beautiful Pictures" / "Cry Baby" 7"
 Small Twenty-One Wall - "Exchange" / "Kiss The Mirror"  7"
 Small Twenty-Two English Subtitles - "Time Tunnel" / "Sweat" / "Reconstruction"  7"
 Small Twenty-Three Proles - "Soft Ground" / "SMK"  7"
 Small Twenty-Four The Cravats - "Precinct" / "Who's In Here With Me?"  7"
 Small Twenty-Five The Cravats - "You're Driving Me" / "I Am The Dreg"  7"
 Small Twenty-Six The Cravats - "Off The Beach" / "And The Sun Shone"  7"
 Small Twenty-Seven Anthrax - "They've Got It All Wrong"  7" (4 Track EP)
 Small Twenty-Eight Camera Obscura - "Destitution" / "Race In Athens"  7"
 RT/SW-001 Angelic Upstarts - "Murder Of Liddle Towers" / "Police Oppression"  7" (Reissue of Angelic Upstarts label press)
 Weeny 1 Patrik Fitzgerald - "Paranoid Ward" EP  12" 9 track EP, also on 7"
 Weeny 2 Crass - "Feeding Of The Five Thousand"  12" (18 track EP, later reissued on the Crass label)
 Weeny 3 Poison Girls / Fatal Microbes - "Closed Shop" / "Piano Lessons" / "Violence Grows" / "Beautiful Pictures"  12"
 Weeny 4 Poison Girls - "Hex"  12" (8 track EP, reissued on Crass)
 Teeny 1 Frank Sumatra - "Te Deum" 12" (4 track EP)
 Teeny 2 Bauhaus - "Bela Lugosi's Dead" / "Boys" / "Dark Entries" (Demo)  12" (White vinyl, 5,000 only - reissued many times)

See also
 List of record labels

References

British independent record labels
Punk record labels
Defunct record labels of the United Kingdom